Jordan Luke Maguire-Drew (born 19 September 1997) is an English professional footballer who plays as a winger for National League club Yeovil Town.

Beginning his career with Brighton & Hove Albion, he has also played in the Football League for Lincoln City, Coventry City, Leyton Orient, Crawley Town and Grimsby Town. He has had spells at Non-league level for Worthing, Dagenham & Redbridge, Wrexham and Woking

Career

Brighton & Hove Albion
Maguire-Drew was born in Crawley, West Sussex. As a child he played for local side Oakwood F.C. before being offered a trial at the youth team of Brighton & Hove Albion where he signed a two-year scholarship. In April 2016, whilst still an under-18 player, he joined local Isthmian League Division One South side Worthing on a youth loan until the end of the season. He scored an impressive eight goals in six games, helping Worthing to win the play-offs and promotion as they beat Faversham Town in the final.

In July 2016, he signed his first professional contract with Brighton, and later in the month he signed for National League side Dagenham & Redbridge on loan for an initial six-month period. He scored on his debut for the club in a 3–0 win against Southport on the first day of the season. In January 2017, the loan was extended until the end of the season after scoring eight goals in twenty-nine appearances. He continued to remain a first team regular and helped Dagenham to a fifth-place finish where they eventually lost out to Forest Green Rovers in the play-off semi-finals. He made a total of forty-eight appearances for the Daggers, scoring sixteen times and won the Young Player of the Year award.

In July 2017, he signed for newly promoted EFL League Two side Lincoln City on a season-long loan deal. He made his league debut in the 2–2 draw with Wycombe Wanderers, replacing Josh Ginnelly as a second-half substitute.  In January 2018 he joined another League Two team, Coventry City, on a half-season loan.

On 1 August 2018, he joined Wrexham on loan for the 2018–19 season. He made his debut for the club on the opening day of the 2018–19 season during a 1–0 victory over Dover Athletic. He returned to Brighton in December 2018.

Leyton Orient
In January 2019, he joined Leyton Orient on a two-year deal for an undisclosed fee. Maguire-Drew was part of the Orient side that won the National League and finished runners-up in the FA Trophy.

He joined Crawley Town on loan until the end of the season on 18 January 2021.

At the end of the 2020–21 season, Maguire-Drew was released by Orient and at the end of his tenure with the O's said “I can’t speak highly enough of my time at Orient, but I was a bit disappointed with how it ended,”

Woking
Maguire-Drew joined Woking in August 2021, following a short-term trial period. He went onto feature seven times, scoring once for The Cards before leaving the club three months later via mutual consent.

Grimsby Town
On 29 November 2021, Maguire-Drew signed an 18 month contract with Grimsby Town. On 5 June 2022, Maguire-Drew scored a 111th minute winner as Grimsby defeated Solihull Moors in the 2022 National League play-off Final to secure an immediate return to the Football League.

Yeovil Town
On 16 December 2022, Maguire-Drew signed for National League side Yeovil Town on an initial one-month loan deal, with the club announcing that personal terms had been agreed to sign him permanently during the January transfer window, subject to the completion of a satisfactory medical. Shortly after the announcement by Yeovil, Grimsby denied that any deal was in place for Maguire-Drew to join on a permanent basis and stipulated that a one month loan was the only thing agreed, but stated that that informal talks over a permanent deal had happened. A month later Maguire-Drew officially departed Grimsby by mutual consent, and subsequently joined Yeovil Town permanently signing an 18-month contract.

Personal life
Maguire-Drew supports Arsenal.

Career statistics

Honours

Club
Coventry City
EFL League Two play-offs: 2017–18

Leyton Orient
National League: 2018–19
FA Trophy runner-up: 2018–19

Grimsby Town
National League play-offs: 2021–22

References

External links

1997 births
Living people
Sportspeople from Crawley
Footballers from West Sussex
English footballers
Association football wingers
Brighton & Hove Albion F.C. players
Worthing F.C. players
Dagenham & Redbridge F.C. players
Lincoln City F.C. players
Coventry City F.C. players
Wrexham A.F.C. players
Leyton Orient F.C. players
Crawley Town F.C. players
Woking F.C. players
Grimsby Town F.C. players
Yeovil Town F.C. players
English Football League players
National League (English football) players
Isthmian League players